Telomerina is a genus of flies belonging to the family Lesser Dung flies.

Species
T. beringiensis Marshall, 1987
T. cana Marshall & Roháček, 1984
T. cellularis (Spuler, 1925)
T. chillcotti Marshall & Roháček, 1984
T. eburnea Roháček, 1983
T. flavipes (Meigen, 1830)
T. kaszabi (Papp, 1973)
T. lanceola Roháček, 1990
T. levifrons (Spuler, 1925)
T. orpha Marshall & Roháček, 1984
T. paraflavipes (Papp, 1973)
T. pengellyi Marshall & Roháček, 1984
T. pseudoleucoptera (Duda, 1924)
T. submerda Marshall & Roháček, 1984
T. ursina Roháček, 1983

References

Sphaeroceridae
Diptera of Africa
Diptera of Asia
Diptera of North America
Diptera of Europe
Diptera of Australasia
Brachycera genera